The Gascoyne Football Association is an Australian rules football competition based in Carnarvon and Exmouth in Western Australia.  The association was formed in 1908.

2010 ladder 
																		
																		
Finals

2011 ladder 
																		
																		
Finals

2012 ladder 
																		
																		
Finals

Further reading 
 A Way of Life - The Story of country football in Western Australia - Alan East

References

Australian rules football competitions in Western Australia